Lee Sang-hyeok (born 19 January 2000) is a South Korean footballer who plays as a winger for Spanish club FC Cartagena.

Club career
A Daegu FC youth graduate, Lee only made his senior debut with FK Pardubice in the Fortuna národní liga, in 2019. He was also a part of the squad which won promotion to Fortuna liga in 2020, but was mainly used as a substitute.

On 1 September 2022, Lee signed a one-year contract with FC Cartagena in Spain.

Career statistics

Club
.

Notes

References

External links

2000 births
Living people
South Korean footballers
South Korean expatriate footballers
Association football midfielders
Czech National Football League players
Daegu FC players
FK Pardubice players
FC Cartagena footballers
South Korean expatriate sportspeople in the Czech Republic
South Korean expatriate sportspeople in Spain
Expatriate footballers in the Czech Republic
Expatriate footballers in Spain
Sportspeople from Daegu